The 2001 Sun Belt Conference football season was the inaugural college football season for the Sun Belt Conference. During the 2001 season, seven schools competed in Sun Belt football: Arkansas State, Idaho, Louisiana–Lafayette, Louisiana–Monroe, Middle Tennessee, New Mexico State and North Texas.

The conference title was won by Middle Tennessee and North Texas.

Coaches
Note: Stats shown are before the beginning of the season

Sun Belt vs. BCS AQ Conference matchups

Regular season

Start times for non-conference games are local for the Sun Belt team; for conference games, starting times are local for the home team. The following list are the teams in their respective time zones: Arkansas State, Louisiana–Monroe, Louisiana–Lafayette, Middle Tennessee, North Texas are located in the Central Time Zone; New Mexico State is in the Mountain Time Zone and Idaho is in the Pacific Time Zone.

Rankings reflect that of the USA Today Coaches poll for that week until week eight when the BCS poll will be used.

Week 1

Open Week: Arkansas State, Idaho, Louisiana-Lafayette, Louisiana-Monroe, Middle Tennessee, North Texas

Week 2

Players of the week:

Week 3

Players of the week:

Week 4

All games scheduled for Week 4 were postponed or canceled as a result of the September 11 attacks.

Week 5

Players of the week:

Week 6

Open Week: Arkansas State

Players of the week:

Week 7

Players of the week:

Week 8

Open Week: Louisiana-Monroe

Players of the week:

Week 9

Open Week: New Mexico State

Players of the week:

Week 10

Open Week: North Texas

Players of the week:

Week 11

Open Week: Louisiana-Lafayette

Players of the week:

Week 12

Open Week: Idaho

Players of the week:

Week 13

Players of the week:

Week 14

Week 15

Open Week: Arkansas State, Idaho, Louisiana-Lafayette, Middle Tennessee, New Mexico State

Players of the week:

Bowl games
In 2001, the Sun Belt Conference placed one team in bowl games through their tie-ins: 5-6 North Texas, who became the first team to play in a bowl game with a losing record. Middle Tennessee was also bowl-eligible but did not receive a bowl invitation.

Note: All times are local

Players of the Year
2001 Sun Belt Player of the Year awards

All-Conference Players
Coaches All-Conference Selections

References